Jump Cut: A Review of Contemporary Media is a journal covering the analysis of film, television, video, and related media. Established in 1974 by John Hess, Chuck Kleinhans (Northwestern University), and Julia Lesage (University of Oregon), it takes its name from the jump cut, a film editing technique in which an abrupt visual change occurs. The publication's stated goal is to approach its subject from a "nonsectarian left, feminist, and anti-imperialist" perspective.

History
Hess, Kleinhans, and Lesage met in Bloomington, Indiana while they were attending graduate school at Indiana University, circa 1970. Kleinhans remembers, "[W]e were actually sitting having a coffee in the university library and saying, 'We should start a film journal,' because John published something in Film Quarterly and Julia and I had published something too." After formulating the journal's principles and gathering articles during 1973, Jump Cut'''s first issue was released in 1974. Each editor contributed $1,000 toward each issue so that they could be free of advertising. Costs were kept low by publishing on newsprint in tabloid format and typing the copy on an electric typewriter (instead of having it typeset). Distribution was initially done by volunteers driving copies to newsstands in Chicagowhere Kleinhans and Lesage took college-teaching jobsand San Francisco/Berkeley, Californiawhere Hess settled. Jump Cut was published in print until 2001. Soon after, it began releasing issues online. As of September 1, 2019, its back issues are available on the Internet Archive for reading or downloading in a variety of formats.

 See also 
 Political cinema

 External links 

 Jump Cut, 1974-2000: The Internet Archive'' hosts a collection of all issues from the beginning until 2000.

References

Magazines about the media
Creative Commons-licensed journals
Feminist magazines
Magazines established in 1974
Magazines disestablished in 2001
Online magazines with defunct print editions
Magazines published in California